Boulkiemdé is one of the 45 provinces of Burkina Faso and is in Centre-Ouest Region. The capital of Boulkiemdé is Koudougou. The population of Boulkiemdé was 498,008 in 2006 and 567,680 in 2011.

Education
In 2011 the province had 437 primary schools and 65 secondary schools.

Healthcare
In 2011 the province had 75 health and social promotion centers (Centres de santé et de promotion sociale), 20 doctors and 262 nurses.

Departments
Boulkiemde is divided into 13 departments as follows:

In pop-culture
Boulkiemdé (specifically the department of Bingo) was a location in the American television series The Amazing Race 12 (2007).

See also
Regions of Burkina Faso
Provinces of Burkina Faso
Departments of Burkina Faso

References

 
Provinces of Burkina Faso